Henry J. Buhr House is a historic home located at Washington, Franklin County, Missouri. It was built about 1873, and is a one to two-story, three bay, side entry brick dwelling on a stone foundation and set on a hillside.  It has a side-gable roof and segmental arched door and window openings.

It was listed on the National Register of Historic Places in 2000.

References

Houses on the National Register of Historic Places in Missouri
Houses completed in 1873
Buildings and structures in Franklin County, Missouri
National Register of Historic Places in Franklin County, Missouri